AMO is a Slovak band.

Discography
Studio albums
 2005: Original (Universal)
 2007: Family biznis (Universal)
 2011: Positive G.A. Records
2013: Rok Nula

Singles
 2012: "Swing" with Celeste Buckingham

Awards

References

External links
 AMO (official website)
 
 AMO at SuperMusic.sk

Slovak musical groups
Musical groups established in 2003